The serratus posterior superior muscle is a thin, quadrilateral muscle. It is situated at the upper back part of the thorax, deep to the rhomboid muscles.

Structure 
The serratus posterior superior muscle arises by an aponeurosis from the lower part of the nuchal ligament, from the spinous processes of C7, T1, T2, and sometimes T3, and from the supraspinal ligament. It is inserted, by four fleshy digitations into the upper borders of the second, third, fourth, and fifth ribs past the angle of the rib.

Function 
The serratus posterior superior muscle elevates the second to fifth ribs. This aids deep respiration.

Additional images

See also
 Serratus anterior muscle
 Serratus posterior inferior muscle

References

Clinically Oriented Anatomy, 4th ed.  Keith L. Moore and Arthur F. Dalley.
Board Review Series: Gross Anatomy, 4th ed.  Kyung Won Chung.

External links

  - "Intermediate layer of the extrinsic muscles of the back, deep muscles."

Muscles of the torso
Thorax (human anatomy)